Sarafan may refer to one of the following:

Sarafan, a Russian traditional women's clothing
List of Legacy of Kain characters
Sarafan (horse), a racehorse